"My Dad" is a song written by Barry Mann and Cynthia Weil and performed by Paul Petersen.  It reached #2 on the adult contemporary chart, #6 on the U.S. pop chart, and #19 on the U.S. R&B chart in 1963.  It was featured on his 1963 album My Dad.

The song was arranged by Jimmie Haskell and Stu Phillips and produced by Phillips.

Other versions
Davy Jones released a version of the song on his 1965 album David Jones.

References

1962 songs
1962 singles
Songs written by Barry Mann
Songs with lyrics by Cynthia Weil
Songs about fathers